The Santa Ynez Forest Reserve was established by the General Land Office in California on October 22, 1899 with . On December 22, 1903 the entire forest was combined with Pine Mountain and Zaka Lake Forest Reserve to create the Santa Barbara Forest Reserve and the name was discontinued.

References

External links
Forest History Society
Listing of the National Forests of the United States and Their Dates (from the Forest History Society website) Text from Davis, Richard C., ed. Encyclopedia of American Forest and Conservation History. New York: Macmillan Publishing Company for the Forest History Society, 1983. Vol. II, pp. 743-788.

Former National Forests of California
Defunct forest reserves of the United States
Santa Ynez Mountains
Los Padres National Forest
Protected areas of Santa Barbara County, California
Protected areas established in 1899
1899 establishments in California
1903 disestablishments in California
Protected areas disestablished in the 1900s